Mohamed Afrah (born 15 November 1971) is a Maldivian film actor and journalist.

Career
In 2019, he made his film career debut in Maldivian first sitcom Karu Hakuru developed by Mohamed Munthasir. His performance as the nosy neighbor and the series received positive reviews from critics. He next appeared in Ilyas Waheed's psychological thriller film Bavathi (2019), where he played the role of Zahir, a middle aged man who performs ruqyah on a disturbed couple. The film narrates the story of a woman who relocates to Male' after marriage and the strange incidents that follow afterwards. The film received positive reviews from critics, where Ifraz Ali from Dho? credited the film with a four star rating and applauded the screenplay for its "tight suspense" while Aminath Luba reviewing from Sun opined that Bavathi will go down the history lane as an "unexpected masterpiece".

Apart from appearing in a small role in Ibrahim Wisan's Girlfriends (2021) and Ilyas Waheed's four-part anthology web series Mazloom (2021), he collaborated with Yoosuf Shafeeu for his web series Giridha (2021). Developed as a hybrid of "sitcom and casual comedy", the series follows three friends who move to Male' in hopes of finding work and lures their lessor to fund for their dream film project.

In 2022, he had multiple releases. He first appeared in a supporting role as a father who abandoned his daughter in Ahmed Nimal directed web series Lafuzu. He then played the role of Mohamed Fikury, a carefree HR manager in the office comedy sitcom Office Loabi developed by Amyna Mohamed. The series along with his performance received positive reviews from critics, where Ahmed Rasheed from MuniAvas praised the performance of Afrah in particular, while highlighting the "excellent integration of a unique concept to the viewers".

He next starred in Bahaulla Ibrahim's family drama television series Shakuvaa alongside Ahmed Easa, Nathasha Jaleel and Nuzuhath Shuaib, playing the supportive friend of the lead actor. This was followed by Azhan Ibrahim's crime thriller web series Dharaka. The series revolves around a high-profile case of the disappearance of a politician's daughter. Reviewing the finale of the series, Ahmed Rasheed from MuniAvas considered the series to be an "excellent watch, if you are interested in good quality series". He was then featured in the first installment from the eight-chapter series titled E Series developed by Yoosuf Shafeeu. In the chapter titled Baby, he played the father of Zeyba, a young girl accused to be possessed by a Jinn.

Filmography

Feature film

Television

References 

Living people
People from Malé
21st-century Maldivian actresses
Maldivian film actors
1971 births